A list of films produced by the Turkish film industry in Turkey in 2007.

Highest-grossing films

References 

2007
Turkey
Films